Vitali Nikolayevich Grishin (born 9 September 1980) is a Russian football coach and a former player.

References

Living people
1980 births
Footballers from Moscow
Russian footballers
Russia under-21 international footballers
FC Dynamo Moscow players
FC Vorskla Poltava players
Russian expatriate footballers
Expatriate footballers in Ukraine
FC Khimki players
FC Amkar Perm players
Russian Premier League players
Ukrainian Premier League players
Russian football managers
Association football midfielders